Kurt Ulrich (28 June 1905 – 11 September 1967) was a German film producer. He produced more than 140 films between 1933 and 1964. He was born in Berlin, Germany.

Selected filmography

 Everything for a Woman (1935)
 Every Day Isn't Sunday (1935)
 The Unfaithful Eckehart (1940)
 Peter Voss, Thief of Millions (1946)
 Nothing But Coincidence (1949) 
  One Night Apart (1950)
 The Heath Is Green (1951)
 Mikosch Comes In (1952)
 The Land of Smiles (1952)
 At the Well in Front of the Gate (1952)
 When The Village Music Plays on Sunday Nights (1953)
 Hooray, It's a Boy! (1953)
 When the White Lilacs Bloom Again (1953)
 The Bird Seller (1953)
 Love is Forever (1954)
 The Gypsy Baron (1954)
 On the Reeperbahn at Half Past Midnight (1954)
  Emil and the Detectives (1954)
 The Happy Village (1955)
 Yes, Yes, Love in Tyrol (1955)
 The Three from the Filling Station (1955)
 Black Forest Melody (1956)
 The Legs of Dolores (1957)
 Spring in Berlin (1957)
 The Fox of Paris (1957)
 Peter Voss, Thief of Millions (1958)
 It Happened Only Once (1958)
 Iron Gustav (1958)
 The Muzzle (1958)
 The Copper (1958)
 The Crammer (1958)
  That's No Way to Land a Man (1959)
 Paradise for Sailors (1959)
 The Man Who Walked Through the Wall (1959)
 Every Day Isn't Sunday (1959)
 Peter Voss, Hero of the Day (1959)
 Old Heidelberg (1959)
 The Avenger (1960)
 The Juvenile Judge (1960)
 Das Kunstseidene Mädchen (1960)
 The Last Witness (1960)
 Three Men in a Boat (1961)
 You Must Be Blonde on Capri (1961)
 The Gypsy Baron (1962)

References

External links

1905 births
1967 deaths
Film people from Berlin
German film producers